Hutovo Blato is a nature reserve and bird reserve located in Bosnia and Herzegovina. It is primarily composed of marshlands that were created by the underground aquifer system of the Krupa River. It is fed from the limestone massif of Ostrvo that divides the Deransko Lake and Svitavsko Lake.
The reserve is on the list of BirdLife International's Important Bird Areas. It is the largest reserve of its kind in the region, in terms of both size and diversity. It is home to over 240 types of migratory birds and dozens that make their permanent home in the sub-Mediterranean wetlands surrounding Deransko Lake. In the migration season, tens of thousands of birds fill the lake and its surroundings.

Wetlands 

The valley along the last 30 km of the Neretva River, and the river itself, comprise a remarkable landscape. Downstream from the confluence of its tributaries, the Trebižat and Bregava rivers, the valley spreads into an alluvial fan covering 20,000 hectares. The upper valley, the 7,411 hectares in Bosnia and Herzegovina, is called Hutovo Blato.

Ramsar site 
Neretva Delta has been recognised as a Ramsar site since 1992, and Hutovo Blato since 2001. Both areas form one integrated Ramsar site that is a natural entity divided by the state border.
The Important Bird Areas programme, conducted by BirdLife International, covers protected areas in Croatia and Bosnia and Herzegovina.

Hutovo Blato Nature Park 

Since 1995, Hutovo Blato has been protected as a Hutovo Blato Nature Park and managed by a public authority. The whole zone is well protected from human impact and functions as an important habitat for many plants and animals
. Historical site, Old Fortress Hutovo Blato, is located in the area of Nature Park.
Nature Park "Hutovo Blato" is located in the South-Western part of Bosnia and Herzegovina, 30 km from City of Mostar and near the Croatian border. It stretches over an area of about 7,411 ha and represents one of the richest wetland reserves in Europe. Until 1995, when the cantonal protected area was founded, Hutovo Blato represented well-known area mainly for its hunting and fishing tourism. Every winter over 200 species of birds find their shelter inside this untouched nature.
Visitors can enjoy relaxation, recreational activities in nature, sport-fishing, cycling and main tourist attraction – photo safari. There is also an educational path providing information of park and for rising environmental awareness and need for preservation of natural heritage in Nature park "Hutovo Blato".

Gornje Blato - Deransko Lake 

The part of the park which kept its original form and almost untouched nature.
Gornje Blato-Deransko Lake is supplied by the karstic water sources of the Trebišnjica river, emerging in the proximity of the bordering hills. It is hydro-geologically connected to the Neretva river through its effluent, the Krupa river, formed out of 5 lakes (Škrka, Deranja, Jelim, Orah, Drijen) and by large portions permanently flooded, also isolated by wide groves of reedbebds and trees, thus representing the most interesting preserved area.

Donje Blato - Svitavsko Lake

Krupa River 

The Krupa River is the Neretva left tributary and the main water current of Hutovo Blato, which leads the waters from Deransko Lake and Svitavsko Lake into the Neretva river. The length of Krupa River is 9 km with an average depth of 5 meters. The Krupa River does not have an actual source, but is actually an arm of Deransko Lake. Also, the Krupa River is a unique river in Europe, because the river flows both ways. It flows 'normally' from the 'source' to the mouth and from the mouth to the 'source'. This happens when, due to high water level and large quantity of water, river Neretva pushes the Krupa River in opposite direction
.

Biodiversity

Endemic and autochthonous fish

Birds
Systematic list of registered species on 13 April 2001:

Little grebe
Great crested grebe
Great cormorant
Pygmy cormorant
Little egret
Grey heron
Purple heron
Gadwall
Mallard
Garganey
Short-toed eagle
Western marsh harrier
Common buzzard
Eurasian coot
Ruff
Wood sandpiper
Black-headed gull
Caspian gull
Alpine swift
Barn swallow
White wagtail
Common nightingale
Cetti's warbler
Eastern subalpine warbler
Blackcap
Long-tailed tit
Eurasian penduline tit
Hooded crow
House sparrow
Common chaffinch
European serin
Cirl bunting
Corn bunting

Archaeological and historic sites

Hutovo Fortress historical site 

Historical site, Hutovo fortress, is located in the area of Nature Park.

Desilo archaeological site 

After intense excavations in the area of Hutovo Blato in the autumn of 2008, archaeologists from the University of Mostar (Bosnia and Herzegovina) and the University of Lund (Sweden) found the very first traces of an Illyrian trading post, thought to be more than two thousand years old.
The find is unique in a European perspective and the archaeologists have concluded that Desilo, as the location is called, was an important trading post and a site of significant contact between the Illyrians and the Romans.
Surprisingly large finds have been made in a short period of time. The archaeologists have discovered the ruins of a settlement, the remains of a harbour that probably functioned as a trading post, as well as many sunken boats, fully laden with wine pitchers – so-called amphorae – from the 1st century BC.
The archaeologist Adam Lindhagen, who holds a PhD from the University of Lund and has specialised in Roman wine amphorae, says that this is the most important find of all time from the Illyrian areas.

See also 

 Mediterranean wetlands
 List of lakes in Bosnia and Herzegovina
 List of protected areas of Bosnia and Herzegovina
 Important Bird Area
 Neretva river
 Krupa river
 Prebilovci (a village just inside the Hutovo Blato area)
 Vrelo Bune natural and historical site
 Počitelj historical village
 Stari Most historical site in Mostar
 The late-antique villa of Mogorjelo
 Desilo archaeological site
 Daorson archaeological site
 Čapljina
 Mostar

References

External links
 Hutovo Blato Nature Park
 Commission for Preservation of National Monuments of Bosnia and Herzegovina
 Krupa river & Hutovo Blato – NAP – Network of Adriatic Parks
NGO for Environment protection ZELENI-NERETVA Konjic
WWF Panda – Living Neretva
Conference Proceedings of the 2009 Adriatic Flyway Conference on bird conservation
REC Transboundary Cooperation Through the Management of Shared Natural Resources
INWEB Internationally Shared Surface Water Bodies in the Balkan Region
Narenta
Wine route Herzegovina
Čapljina municipality
Neretva.org Open Project

 
Nature parks of Bosnia and Herzegovina
Important Bird Areas of Bosnia and Herzegovina
Ramsar sites in Bosnia and Herzegovina
Protected areas of Bosnia and Herzegovina
Lakes of Bosnia and Herzegovina
Archaeology of Illyria
Tourist attractions in Bosnia and Herzegovina
Tourism in Bosnia and Herzegovina
Neretva basin
Recreational fishing in Bosnia and Herzegovina